Salem Township is one of the fourteen townships of Jefferson County, Ohio, United States.  The 2010 census found 3,148 people in the township, 2,667 of whom lived in the unincorporated portions of the township.

Geography
Located in the western part of the county, it borders the following townships:
Ross Township - north
Knox Township - northeast corner
Island Creek Township - east
Cross Creek Township - southeast corner
Wayne Township - south
German Township, Harrison County - southwest
Springfield Township - northwest

The village of Richmond is located in northeastern Salem Township, and the unincorporated community of East Springfield lies in the northwestern part of the township.

Name and history
Salem Township was founded in 1807.

It is one of fourteen Salem Townships statewide.

Government
The township is governed by a three-member board of trustees, who are elected in November of odd-numbered years to a four-year term beginning on the following January 1. Two are elected in the year after the presidential election and one is elected in the year before it. There is also an elected township fiscal officer, who serves a four-year term beginning on April 1 of the year after the election, which is held in November of the year before the presidential election. Vacancies in the fiscal officership or on the board of trustees are filled by the remaining trustees.

References

External links
Township website
County website

Townships in Jefferson County, Ohio
Townships in Ohio
Populated places established in 1807
Quakerism in Ohio